St Peter's Church is a Church of England parish church in the village of Duxford in Cambridgeshire. From medieval times until the 19th century it was one of two parish churches in the village (the other being St John's), but their two parishes were merged in 1874 and St Peter's is now the sole parish church for the village. It has been Grade I listed since 1967.

It is located in the south of the village and has been dedicated to St Peter since at least 1275. Built with a chancel, an aisled and clerestoried nave, and a west tower, it was originally built in the 12th century, and the tower and part of the chancel remain from this period. The nave was rebuilt in the 14th or 15th century. In 1728 the tower had the existing tall spire removed and replaced with the present shorter one. By the time the parishes were merged, the building was in a poor state, and had to be extensively repaired in the 1880s.

Its parish is part of a combined benefice with those of St Mary Magdalene Church, Ickleton and SS Mary and John, Hinxton.

References

Duxford
Duxford